Fox Rothschild LLP is an American AmLaw100 law firm founded in Philadelphia in 1907 by Edwin Fox and Jerome J. Rothschild.

History
From 2005 to 2010, the firm expanded from 10 offices to 15 offices, then to 27 offices in 2018. On January 1, 2016, Fox Rothschild merged with Minneapolis law firm Oppenheimer Wolff & Donnelly. On September 20, 2018, Fox Rothschild announced its merger with Smith Moore Leatherwood adding 130 attorneys across six locations to the firm, expanding Fox Rothschild's footprint into the Southeast.

Notable practices
Fox Rothschild is a full-service law firm known particularly for the strength of its Real Estate, Emerging Companies & Venture Capital, Bankruptcy & Restructuring, Entertainment, Litigation, Intellectual Property and Labor & Employment practices. The firm is also considered a market leader in certain highly regulated industries, most notably Cannabis and Gaming.

As of June 2022, the firm operates from 29 offices across the United States.

References

Law firms established in 1907
1907 establishments in Pennsylvania
Law firms based in Philadelphia